Estoloides esthlogenoides is a species of beetle in the family Cerambycidae. It was described by Stephan von Breuning in 1943. It is known from Costa Rica.

References

Estoloides
Beetles described in 1943